John Douglas Sandford (3 August 1832 – 26 May 1892) was an English first-class cricketer and a judicial official in the Indian Civil Service.

Biography 
The son of future Archdeacon of Coventry John Sandford,  he was born in August 1832 at Chillingham, Northumberland. He was educated at Rugby School, before going up to Trinity College, Oxford. While studying at Oxford, he made two appearances in first-class cricket for Oxford University against the Marylebone Cricket Club (MCC) in 1855 and 1856.

After graduating from Oxford, Sandford joined the Indian Civil Service in 1856, where he served in the North-Western Provinces and rose up the judicial system in British India to become the judicial commissioner of Burma and Mysore. He returned to England in 1868, where became a student of the Inner Temple at the age of 36, and was called to the bar in June 1870. The year following his return to England, and thirteen years after his previous appearance in first-class cricket, Sandford played a first-class match for the MCC against Oxford University at Oxford. After being called to the bar, he returned to British India where he practiced as a barrister until his departure in 1882. He retired two years later in 1884. Sandford died in May 1892 at Windsor, Berkshire.

Born into and ecclesiastical family, his younger brother, Ernest, was the Archdeacon of Exeter (in addition to being a first-class cricketer), and his elder brother, Charles, who was the Bishop of Gibraltar. His grandfather, Daniel Sandford, was the Bishop of Edinburgh. His nephew, Temple Sandford, was also a first-class cricketer.

References

External links

1832 births
1892 deaths
English people of Irish descent
Sportspeople from Northumberland
People educated at Rugby School
Alumni of Trinity College, Oxford
English cricketers
Oxford University cricketers
Indian Civil Service (British India) officers
British Burma judges
Marylebone Cricket Club cricketers
English barristers
Members of the Inner Temple
19th-century English lawyers
British India judges